Glen Alton Huff (born June 18, 1951) is a Judge of the Virginia Court of Appeals.

Life and education

Huff was born in 1951 in Skowhegan, Maine. He received his Bachelor of Arts from University of Maine and his Juris Doctor from the University of New Hampshire School of Law.

Legal career

He practiced law with the firm of Huff, Poole & Mahoney, P.C. in Hampton Roads, Virginia.

Service on Virginia Court of Appeals

He was elected by the General Assembly on July 29, 2011, to an eight-year term beginning August 1, 2011, to fill the vacancy created by the elevation of Cleo E. Powell to the Supreme Court of Virginia. He was re-elected to a second eight-year term on January 16, 2019.  His current term expires in 2027. He was elected by the court on October 20, 2014, to a four-year term as chief judge beginning January 1, 2015, filling the vacancy created by the retirement of Walter S. Felton Jr. He was succeed as Chief Judge by Judge Marla Graff Decker.

References

External links

Living people
20th-century American lawyers
21st-century American judges
1951 births
Judges of the Court of Appeals of Virginia
People from Skowhegan, Maine
University of Maine alumni
University of New Hampshire School of Law alumni